The 28th National Film Awards, presented by Ministry of Information, Bangladesh to felicitate the best of Bangladeshi Cinema released in the year 2003. Bangladesh National Film Awards is a film award ceremony in Bangladesh established in 1975 by Government of Bangladesh.  Every year, a national panel appointed by the government selects the winning entry, and the award ceremony is held in Dhaka. Chief Adviser Dr. Fakhruddin Ahmed presented the awards at the Bangladesh-China Friendship Conference Centre on 23 October.

List of winners 
A 12-member jury board headed by Sadeq Khan, Chairman of board of directors, Press Institute of Bangladesh suggested the name of 15 artistes for the National Film Award in recognition of their outstanding contributions to the country's film industry. No awards were given in Best Film, director, Music Director, Dialogue, Cinematography and Editing Categories.

Merit Awards

Technical Awards

See also 
 Bachsas Awards
 Meril Prothom Alo Awards
 Ifad Film Club Award
 Babisas Award

References

External links 

National Film Awards (Bangladesh) ceremonies
2003 film awards
2008 awards in Bangladesh
2008 in Dhaka
October 2008 events in Bangladesh